The Sphaerosepalaceae are a family of flowering plants including 14 species of trees and shrubs in two genera, Dialyceras and Rhopalocarpus, all of which are endemic to Madagascar. The family has previously been recognized as Rhopalocarpaceae.

References

 
Endemic flora of Madagascar
Malvales families